Sébastien Charpentier (born April 18, 1977) is a Canadian former professional ice hockey goaltender.

Early life
Charpentier was born in Drummondville, Quebec. As a youth, he played in the 1991 Quebec International Pee-Wee Hockey Tournament with a minor ice hockey team from Drummondville. In junior ice hockey, he was named to Quebec Major Junior Hockey League all-rookie team in the 1994–95 QMJHL season.

Career 
Charpentier was drafted 93rd overall by the Washington Capitals in the 1995 NHL Entry Draft. He spent most of his professional career with their American Hockey League affiliate, the Portland Pirates. He played a total of 24 NHL games for the Capitals. He was named the ECHL playoff most valuable player in the 1997–98 ECHL season.

He later played with the Graz 99ers of the Austrian Erste Bank Hockey League until he retired in 2013. As of 2018, he is the goalie coach for the Victoriaville Tigres of the QMJHL.

References

External links

1977 births
Living people
Canadian ice hockey goaltenders
French Quebecers
HC MVD players
HC Vityaz players
Ice hockey people from Quebec
Laval Titan Collège Français players
Sportspeople from Drummondville
Shawinigan Cataractes players
Val-d'Or Foreurs players
Washington Capitals draft picks
Washington Capitals players
Canadian expatriate ice hockey players in Russia